This is a list of player transfers involving Premiership Rugby teams before or during the 2018–19 season. The list is of deals that are confirmed and are either from or to a rugby union team in the Premiership during the 2017–18 season. Bristol Bears won promotion to the Premiership from the 2018-19 season, whilst London Irish were relegated to the RFU Championship from the 2018-19 season.

Bath

Players In
 Jackson Willison from  Worcester Warriors
 Lucas Noguera Paz from  Jaguares
 Victor Delmas from  Colomiers
 Darren Atkins promoted from Academy
 Ruaridh McConnochie from  England Sevens
 Jamie Roberts from  Harlequins
 Will Chudley from  Exeter Chiefs
 Joe Cokanasiga from  London Irish
 Alex Davies from  Yorkshire Carnegie
 Jacques van Rooyen from  Lions

Players Out
 Matt Banahan to  Gloucester
 Josh Lewis to  Dragons
 Ben Tapuai to  Harlequins
 Nick Auterac to  Harlequins
 James Phillips to  Sale Sharks
 Nathan Charles to  Melbourne Rebels
 Rory Jennings to  London Scottish
 Will Homer to  Jersey Reds
 Kane Palma-Newport to  Colomiers
 Shaun Knight to  Rouen
 James Wilson to  Southland
 Harry Davies to  Bedford Blues
 Jeff Williams to  Rodez Aveyron
 Darren Allinson released

Bristol Bears

Players In
 Charles Piutau from  Ulster
 John Afoa from  Gloucester
 Shaun Malton from  Exeter Chiefs
 Nic Stirzaker from  Melbourne Rebels
 Yann Thomas from  Rouen
 Aly Muldowney from  Grenoble
 Tiff Eden from  Nottingham
 Harry Thacker from  Leicester Tigers
 Jake Heenan from  Connacht
 Jordan Lay from  Edinburgh
 Ollie Dawe promoted from Academy
 Tom Lindsay from  Bedford Blues
 Jake Armstrong from  Jersey Reds
 Jake Woolmore from  Jersey Reds
 Tom Pincus from  Jersey Reds
 Lewis Thiede from  Ealing Trailfinders
 Piers O'Conor from  Ealing Trailfinders
 Luke Daniels from  Ealing Trailfinders
 Harry Randall from  Gloucester
 Ed Holmes from  Exeter Chiefs
 James Lay from  Bay of Plenty
 George Smith from  Queensland Reds

Players Out
 Jordan Williams to  Dragons
 Rhodri Williams to  Dragons
 Olly Robinson to  Cardiff Blues
 Max Crumpton to  Harlequins
 Ryan Bevington to  Dragons
 David Lemi to  Chanlon
 Jack O'Connell to  Ealing Trailfinders
 Tyler Gendall to  Cornish Pirates
 James Newey to  Jersey Reds
 Billy Searle to  Wasps
 Soane Tonga'uiha to  Ampthill
 Giorgi Nemsadze to  Ospreys
 Gaston Cortes to  Leicester Tigers
 Jack Wallace to  Richmond
 Dan Tuohy to  Vannes
 Jordan Liney to  Hartpury College
 Ross McMillan to  Leicester Tigers
 Alex Giltrow to  Clifton
 Jason Harris-Wright released
 Thretton Palamo released
 Ryan Glynn released
 Ben Gompels released

Exeter Chiefs

Players In
 Alex Cuthbert from  Cardiff Blues
 Santiago Cordero from  Jaguares

Players Out
 Kai Horstmann retired
 Shaun Malton to  Bristol Bears
 Thomas Waldrom to  Wellington Lions
 Will Chudley to  Bath
 Ed Holmes to  Bristol Bears
 Julian Salvi retired
 Carl Rimmer retired
 Michele Campagnaro to  Wasps

Gloucester

Players In
 Matt Banahan from  Bath
 Franco Marais from  Sharks
 Jaco Kriel from  Lions
 Danny Cipriani from  Wasps
 Tom Hudson promoted from Academy
 Gerbrandt Grobler from  Munster
 Will Safe promoted from Academy
 Franco Mostert from  Lions
 Ruan Dreyer from  Lions
 Todd Gleave from  London Irish
 Kyle Traynor from  Leicester Tigers
 Mike Sherry from  Munster (loan)

Players Out
 Ross Moriarty to  Dragons
 Richard Hibbard to  Dragons 
 John Afoa to  Bristol Bears
 Matt Scott to  Edinburgh
 Cameron Orr to  Western Force
 Andy Symons to  Northampton Saints
 Tom Denton to  Ealing Trailfinders
 Harry Randall to  Bristol Bears
 David Halaifonua to  Coventry
 Charlie Beckett to  Jersey Reds
 Jeremy Thrush to  Western Force
 Ed Bogue to  Cinderford
 Motu Matu'u to  London Irish
 Elliott Creed to  Doncaster Knights
 Billy Burns to  Ulster
 Alfie North to  Ayr
 Jacob Rowan retired
 Carwyn Penny to  Dragons
 Mariano Galarza to  Bordeaux
 Mason Tonks to  Worcester Warriors

Harlequins

Players In
 Marcus Smith promoted from Academy
 Nathan Earle from  Saracens
 Max Crumpton from  Bristol Bears
 Alex Dombrandt from  Cardiff Metropolitan University
 Ben Tapuai from  Bath
 Nick Auterac from  Bath
 Matt Symons from  Wasps
 Paul Lasike from  Utah Warriors
 Semi Kunatani from  Toulouse

Players Out
 Jamie Roberts to  Bath
 Winston Stanley retired
 Adam Jones retired
 Harry Sloan to  Ealing Trailfinders
 Sam Aspland-Robinson to  Leicester Tigers
 Charlie Matthews to  Wasps
 Ian Prior to  Western Force
 Cameron Holenstein to  Jersey Reds
 Sam Twomey to  London Irish
 Jono Kitto to  Northland
 Joe Gray to  Northampton Saints (short-term deal)
 Tim Swiel to  Newcastle Falcons

Leicester Tigers

Players In
 Guy Thompson from  Wasps
 Will Spencer from  Worcester Warriors
 David Denton from  Worcester Warriors
 James Voss from  Jersey Reds
 Sam Aspland-Robinson from  Harlequins
 Jimmy Stevens from  Nottingham
 Gaston Cortes from  Bristol Bears
 Owen Hills promoted from Academy
 Charlie Thacker promoted from Academy
 Fred Tuilagi promoted from Academy
 George Worth promoted from Academy
 Kyle Eastmond from  Wasps
 Campese Ma'afu from  Northampton Saints
 David Feao from  Narbonne
 Ross McMillan from  Bristol Bears
 Felipe Ezcurra from  Jaguares (short-term deal)
 Tom Varndell from  Angouleme
 Leonardo Sarto from  Glasgow Warriors

Players Out
 Harry Thacker to  Bristol Bears
 Dominic Barrow to  Northampton Saints
 Ben Betts to  Ealing Trailfinders
 Logovi'i Mulipola to  Newcastle Falcons
 George McGuigan to  Newcastle Falcons
 Joe Maksymiw to  Connacht
 Nick Malouf to  Australia Sevens
 George Catchpole retired
 Michele Rizzo to  Petrarca
 Luke Hamilton to  Edinburgh
 Pat Cilliers to  London Irish
 Dominic Ryan retired
 Afa Pakalani to  NSW Country Eagles
 Tom Brady to  Carcassonne
 Kyle Traynor to  Gloucester
 Chris Baumann released

Newcastle Falcons

Players In
 Guy Graham from  Hawick
 Tom Arscott from  Rouen
 Logovi'i Mulipola from  Leicester Tigers
 George McGuigan from  Leicester Tigers
 Johnny Williams from  London Irish
 Connor Collett from  North Harbour
 Nemani Nagusa from  Aurillac
 Pedro Bettencourt from  Carcassonne
 Paul Mullen from  Houston SaberCats (short-term deal)
 Tim Swiel from  Harlequins
 John Hardie from  Edinburgh
 Rodney Ah You from  Ulster

Players Out
 Juan Pablo Socino to  Edinburgh
 Harrison Orr to  Western Force
 D. T. H. van der Merwe to  Glasgow Warriors
 Belisario Agulla to  Hindu Club
 Craig Willis to  Ealing Trailfinders
 Jake Ilnicki to  Yorkshire Carnegie
 Rob Vickers retired
 Ally Hogg retired
 Scott Lawson retired
 Nick Civetta to  Doncaster Knights
 Maxime Mermoz to  Toulouse
 Nili Latu to  Hino Red Dolphins
 Evan Olmstead to  Auckland
 Ben Sowrey to  Wharfedale
 Cameron Cowell to  Doncaster Knights (season-long loan)
 Max Davies to  Ealing Trailfinders
 Andrew Davidson to  Glasgow Warriors (short-term deal)
 Scott Wilson retired

Northampton Saints

Players In
 Dan Biggar from  Ospreys
 Taqele Naiyaravoro from  NSW Waratahs
 Will Davis from  Ealing Trailfinders
 Ben Franks from  London Irish
 Dominic Barrow from  Leicester Tigers
 Andy Symons from  Gloucester
 James Haskell from  Wasps
 Matt Worley from  Racing 92
 Charlie Davies from  Dragons
 Andrew Kellaway from  NSW Waratahs
 Joe Gray from  Harlequins (short-term deal)

Players Out
 Sam Dickinson to  Ealing Trailfinders
 Jordan Onojaife to  Ealing Trailfinders
 Nic Groom to  Lions
 Charlie Clare to  Bedford Blues
 Matt Beesley to  Ealing Trailfinders
 Christian Day retired
 Rob Horne retired
 George North to  Ospreys
 Ben Nutley to  Coventry
 Stephen Myler to  London Irish
 Tom Stephenson to  London Irish
 Kieran Brookes to  Wasps
 Tom Kessell to  Coventry
 Juan Pablo Estelles to  Atlético del Rosario
 Ben Foden to  Rugby United New York
 Jamie Elliott to  Bedford Blues
 Campese Ma'afu to  Leicester Tigers
 Alex Woolford to  Coventry 
 Josh Peters to  Blackheath
 Michael Paterson released

Sale Sharks

Players In
 Joe Jones from  Perpignan
 James Phillips from  Bath
 Rohan Janse van Rensburg from  Lions
 Chris Ashton from  Toulon
 Tom Bristow from  Narbonne
 Robert du Preez from  Sharks (short-term deal)
 Valery Morozov from  Enisei-STM

Players Out
 Mike Haley to  Munster
 Josh Charnley to  Warrington Wolves
 Will Addison to  Ulster 
 David Seymour to  Sale FC
 Halani Aulika to  Grenoble
 TJ Ioane to  London Irish
 Marc Jones to  Scarlets

Saracens

Players In
 Alex Lewington from  London Irish
 David Strettle from  Clermont
 Tom Woolstencroft from  London Irish
 Viliami Hakalo from  Nottingham
 Christian Judge from  Cornish Pirates (short-term loan)
 Joe Gray from  Northampton Saints
 Chris van Zyl from  Stormers (short-term deal)

Players Out
 Schalk Brits retired
 Nathan Earle to  Harlequins
 Chris Wyles retired
 Kieran Longbottom to  Western Force
 Danny Cutmore to  Cornish Pirates
 Mark Flanagan to  Bedford Blues
 Matt Hankin retired
 Mike Ellery to  England Sevens
 Joel Conlon retired

Wasps

Players In
 Brad Shields from  Hurricanes
 Lima Sopoaga from  Highlanders
 Joe Atkinson from  London Scottish
 Ross Neal from  London Scottish
 Michael Le Bourgeois from  Bedford Blues
 Ben Morris from  Nottingham
 Billy Searle from  Bristol Bears
 Ambrose Curtis from  Manawatu
 Charlie Matthews from  Harlequins
 Tom West promoted from Academy
 Will Stuart promoted from Academy
 Nizaam Carr from  Stormers
 Kieran Brookes from  Northampton Saints
 Zurab Zhvania from  Stade Francais
 Michele Campagnaro from  Exeter Chiefs

Players Out
 Marty Moore to  Ulster
 Guy Thompson to  Leicester Tigers
 Sam Jones retired
 Guy Armitage to  Ealing Trailfinders
 Will Owen to  Nottingham
 Danny Cipriani to  Gloucester
 James Haskell to  Northampton Saints
 Matt Symons to  Harlequins
 Alex Lundberg to  Ealing Trailfinders
 Kyle Eastmond to  Leicester Tigers
 Paul Doran-Jones to  Rosslyn Park
 Brendan Macken to  London Irish
 Christian Wade retired

Worcester Warriors

Players In
 Callum Black from  Ulster
 Ashley Beck from  Ospreys
 Cornell du Preez from  Edinburgh
 Michael Heaney from  Doncaster Knights
 Isaac Miller from  London Scottish
 Scott van Breda from  Jersey Reds
 Jono Lance from  Queensland Reds
 Francois Venter from  Cheetahs
 Michael Fatialofa from  Hurricanes
 Duncan Weir from  Edinburgh
 Farai Mudariki from  Tarbes
 Justin Clegg promoted from Academy
 Zac Xiourouppa promoted from Academy
 Mason Tonks from  Gloucester

Players Out
 Donncha O'Callaghan retired
 Huw Taylor to  Dragons
 Jackson Willison to  Bath
 Will Spencer to  Leicester Tigers
 David Denton to  Leicester Tigers
 Sam Olver to  Ealing Trailfinders
 Andrew Durutalo to  Ealing Trailfinders
 Michael Dowsett to  Canon Eagles
 Ben Howard to  England Sevens
 Kurt Haupt to  SWD Eagles
 Grayson Hart to  London Scottish
 Max Stelling to  Hino Red Dolphins
 Peter Stringer retired
 Biyi Alo to  Coventry
 Tom Heathcote released

See also
List of 2018–19 Pro14 transfers
List of 2018–19 RFU Championship transfers
List of 2018–19 Super Rugby transfers
List of 2018–19 Top 14 transfers
List of 2018-19 Major League Rugby transfers

References

2018-19
transfers